{{Speciesbox
|image =
|status = EN
|status_system = IUCN3.1
|status_ref = 
|genus = Eleutherococcus 
|species = setulosus
|authority = (Franchet) S. Y. Hu
|synonyms = 
Acanthopanax setulosus Franchet
Acanthopanax  zhejiangensis X. J. Xue & S. T. Fang
Eleutherococcus asperatus' (Franch. & Sav.) Koidz.
Eleutherococcus pseudosetulosus C. H. Kim & B. Y. Sun
Eleutherococcus zhejiangensis (X. J. Xue & S. T. Fang) H. Ohashi
|synonyms_ref = 
}}Eleutherococcus setulosus''''' is a plant species in the family Araliaceae. It is native to the Chinese provinces of Anhui, Gansu, Sichuan and Zhejiang.

Flowers are born in axillary umbels.

References

setulosus
Endemic flora of China